Campiglossa perspicillata is a species of tephritid or fruit flies in the genus Campiglossa of the family Tephritidae.

Distribution
The species is native to South Africa.

References

Tephritinae
Insects described in 1918
Taxa named by Mario Bezzi
Diptera of Africa